The Pacific Western Rugby Conference (PWRC) is a college rugby conference in the United States. The conference spans northern California and northern Nevada.

Members
 Chico State University
 Fresno State University
 University of Nevada, Reno
 San Francisco State University
 San Josè State University
 UC Santa Cruz
 Stanford University

References

External links
 

 
Sports leagues established in 2012
2012 establishments in the United States